Diarmuid McMahon (born 1981) is an Irish sportsperson. He plays hurling with his local club Kilmaley and has been a member of the Clare senior hurling team since 2004.

References 

Living people
Kilmaley hurlers
Clare inter-county hurlers
People from Ennis
1981 births